Sid A. Saab (born February 20, 1971) is an American politician who was a Republican member of the Maryland House of Delegates, representing district 33 (Anne Arundel County).

Early life
Said Amal Saab was born in Lebanon on February 20, 1971, and migrated to the United States in 1990.

In the legislature
Saab was elected to the House of Delegates in the 2014 General Assembly elections, succeeding delegate Robert A. Costa and becoming the first member of the Maryland General Assembly to have been born in Lebanon.

In January 2020, Saab worked with delegate Bonnie Cullison to introduce a bill that would require hospitals or nursing facilities in the state to begin ensuring personnel wear an identification tag when providing patient care. The bill would pass the House of Delegates and Senate by votes of 136-0 and 45-0, respectively, and would be signed by Governor Larry Hogan. In April 2020, Saab joined delegates Brian Crisholm, Susan Krebs, Matthew Morgan, Teresa Reilly, Kathy Szeliga, and Nic Kipke in pressing the Hogan administration to release data on the 2,000 inmates released at the beginning of the COVID-19 pandemic and COVID-19 case outbreaks in nursing homes and other elder care facilities.

In February 2021, Saab joined delegates Kathy Szeliga and Dan Cox at a protest against abortion at the Maryland State House.

In April 2021, Saab told Maryland Matters that he was actively considering a run for Anne Arundel County executive. In December 2021, he announced that he would seek a third term in the House of Delegates instead of running for executive, but later announced in April 2022 that he would run for Maryland Senate in 2022, seeking to succeed outgoing state Senator Edward R. Reilly. Saab was defeated by Democrat Dawn Gile in the general election.

Personal life
Saab is married to Sarah. They have three children.

Electoral history

References

Living people
1971 births
American people of Lebanese descent
American politicians of Lebanese descent
Republican Party members of the Maryland House of Delegates
Lebanese emigrants to the United States
21st-century American politicians